Masalia was a genus of moths of the family Noctuidae. It is now considered to be a subgenus of Heliothis.

Selected species
Heliothis albida (Hampson, 1905)
Heliothis philbyi (Brandt, 1941)
Heliothis perstriata (Brandt, 1941)
See: Heliothis

References
Natural History Museum Lepidoptera genus database

Heliothis
Insect subgenera